Jean Roy Deysel (born 5 March 1985 in Virginia, Free State, South Africa) is a former professional rugby union player who most recently played for Ulster in the Pro14.

Deysel signed a two-year contract to join Japanese side Toyota Verblitz at the conclusion of the 2014 Super Rugby season. On 16 March 2017, it was announced that Deysel had joined Irish Pro12 side Munster on a three-month loan as injury cover for his compatriot Jean Kleyn. On 8 April 2017, Deysel made his debut for Munster when he started against Scottish side Glasgow Warriors in a 2016–17 Pro12 fixture. Munster won 10–7, with Deysel being replaced by Peter O'Mahony in the 42nd minute. On 22 April 2017, Deysel made his European debut when he replaced Tommy O'Donnell in Munster's 2016–17 semi-final defeat at the hands of defending champions Saracens in the Aviva Stadium, Dublin. On 27 May 2017, Deysel made his final appearance for Munster when he came off the bench against Scarlets in the 2017 Pro12 Grand Final. Following the completion of his loan spell at Munster, Deysel was granted an early release from his Sharks contract and signed a two-year deal with another Irish province, this time moving to Ulster. Ulster announced on 24 October 2018, Deysel would retire from professional rugby with immediate effect.

References

External links
Sharks Profile

Springbok Rugby Hall of Fame
Munster Profile
itsrugby.co.uk Profile
EPCR Profile
Pro14 Profile

1985 births
Living people
South African rugby union players
South Africa international rugby union players
Golden Lions players
Sharks (rugby union) players
Sharks (Currie Cup) players
Afrikaner people
South African expatriate rugby union players
South African expatriate sportspeople in Ireland
Expatriate rugby union players in Ireland
Toyota Verblitz players
Munster Rugby players
Ulster Rugby players
Rugby union flankers
Rugby union locks
Rugby union number eights
Rugby union players from the Free State (province)